Andaman is a 1998 Indian Kannada-language drama film written and directed by P. H. Vishwanath. The film starred Shiva Rajkumar and Soni. Shiv Rajkumar's daughter Niveditha made her acting debut featuring in a prominent role and won the Karnataka State Film Award for her performance. The film had a musical score by Hamsalekha and was jointly produced by Padmalatha.

Plot
Monisha and Anand are a happily married couple with a child, Chummi. But a small misunderstanding leads to their divorce leaving Anand pining for his daughter's affection. Though Chummy wants to stay with her father but Monisha wants none of it. It is revealed that Monisha's friend Aravind is responsible for creating misunderstanding between the couple for not being able to marry Monisha whom he is in love with since childhood. In the end, Aravind gets killed by falling off from elevator and the couple gets united.

Cast
 Shiva Rajkumar as Anand
 Soni as Monisha
 Sumanth as Aravind
 Niveditha Shiva Rajkumar as Chummy
 Vinaya Prasad as Zubeidaa
 H. G. Dattatreya as Lieutenant Governor of Andaman and Nicobar Islands
 Ramesh Pandit as SI Khader

Soundtrack
All the songs are composed and written by Hamsalekha.

Awards
 Karnataka State Film Award for Best Child Actor (Female) - Baby Niveditha Shiva Rajkumar

References

1998 films
1990s Kannada-language films
1998 action drama films
Films scored by Hamsalekha
Indian action drama films
1998 drama films